The Oonchi Mosque, or Oonchi Masjid (Punjabi) is a Mughal-era mosque located along the Hakiman Bazaar, near the Bhati Gate which leads into the Walled City of Lahore, in Pakistan. The mosque may date from the reign of the Emperor Akbar. It has been extensively renovated throughout its history, resulting in little of the original mosque's decorative elements being preserved.

Background
The mosque's name means "High Mosque," and refers to the fact that the mosque was built upon a high platform. Unlike the grand Mughal mosques such as Wazir Khan Mosque and Badshahi Mosque, no inscription exists which signifies the year of the mosque's construction.

History
The mosque is often said to date from the reign of Akbar, however, evidence also suggest that the mosque may have been built later, during the reign of Aurangzeb.

It is said that the spiritual master of the great Punjabi poet and Sufi saint, Baba Bulleh Shah, Shah Inayat Qadiri, was Imam of the mosque. Mulla Abdul Qadir Badayuni mentions in his writing the mosque as a platform during the reign of Akbar.

The mosque has been ascribed to a mashki - a water carrier. A tughra was once located on the mosque's outer gate which read:

Architecture
The mosque features three archways and a small ablution pool for the performance of the Islamic ritual washing. Two niches along the mosque's western wall bear Quranic verses, while a third bears the name of Abul Fateh Jalal-ud-Din Muhammad Akbar Badshah Ghazi.

See also 
 Lahore
 Mosques of Lahore
 Walled City of Lahore
 Islamic Architecture
 Mughal architecture

References

Mosques in Lahore
Mughal mosques
Walled City of Lahore